The Ring of Giuditta Foscari (German: Der Ring der Giuditta Foscari) is a 1917 German silent film directed by Alfred Halm and starring Emil Jannings, Harry Liedtke, and Erna Morena. It was shot at the Tempelhof Studios in Berlin. The film's sets were designed by the art director Paul Leni.

Cast
 Erna Morena as Giuditta Foscari 
 Emil Jannings
Harry Liedtke

References

Bibliography
 Bock, Hans-Michael & Bergfelder, Tim. The Concise CineGraph. Encyclopedia of German Cinema. Berghahn Books, 2009.

External links

1917 films
Films of the German Empire
German silent feature films
Films directed by Alfred Halm
German black-and-white films
1910s German films
Films shot at Tempelhof Studios